Glavica may refer to:

Places

Bosnia and Herzegovina
 Glavica, Bosanska Krupa, a village
 Glavica, Glamoč, a village
 Glavica, Velika Kladuša, a village
 Drenova Glavica, a village near Bosanska Krupa
 Gola Glavica, a village near Trebinje
 Kunja Glavica, a village near Trebinje

Croatia
 Glavica, Požega-Slavonia County, a village near Pakrac
 Glavica, Karlovac County, a village near Bosiljevo
 Glavica, Zadar County, a village near Sukošan
 Kadina Glavica, a village near Drniš

Kosovo
 Glavica, Lipljan, a village near Lipljan
 Glavica, Štimlje, a village near Štimlje

Serbia
 Glavica (Paraćin), a village
 Glavica, Sremska Kamenica, a neighborhood
 Glavica, Paraćin, a village near Paraćin

People
 Dejan Glavica (born 1991), Croatian footballer
 Vladimir Klaić (1925–1970), nicknamed Glavica, Croatian footballer